Chernihiv Governorate was an administrative territorial subdivision of the Ukrainian State and the Ukrainian SSR, existing from 1918 to 1925. It was inherited from the Russian system of territorial subdivisions that existed prior to World War I.

Administrative division
The governorate consisted of 18 counties (povits).

Borzna County
Hlukhiv County
Horodnya County
Homel County (added from the Mogilev Governorate)
Kozelets County
Konotop County
Krolevets County
Nizhin County
Novhorod-Siversky County
Oster County
Putyvl County (added from the Kursk Governorate)
Rylsk County (added from the Kursk Governorate)
Sosnytsia County
Chernihiv County
Mhlyn County
Novozybkiv County
Starodub County
Surazh County
In 1919, the northern Mhlyn, Novozybkiv, Starodub, and Surazh counties, with their mixed Ukrainian–Belarusian–Russian population, were transferred from Ukraine to the newly established Gomel Governorate of the Russian republic.

In 1925, the governorate’s territory was redistributed among Hlukhiv, Konotop, Nizhyn, and Chernihiv districts (okruhas).

References

External links
 Chernihiv Governorate. Encyclopedia of Ukraine.

1918 establishments in Ukraine
1925 disestablishments in Ukraine
Political history of Ukraine
Governorates of Ukraine